Bill C-32 refers to various legislation introduced into the House of Commons of Canada, including:
 Canadian Environmental Protection Act, 1999, introduced to the first session of the 36th Canadian Parliament
 An Act to amend the Copyright Act (40th Canadian Parliament, 3rd Session), not passed

Canadian federal legislation